Ralph Simon Sharon (September 17, 1923 – March 31, 2015) was a British-American jazz pianist and arranger.  He is best known for working with Tony Bennett as his pianist on numerous recordings and live performances.

Biography
Ralph Sharon was born in London, England, to a British mother and Latvian-born father.  He emigrated to the United States in early 1954, becoming a naturalized citizen of the United States five years later.

By 1958, Ralph Sharon was recording with Tony Bennett as accompanist. That was the start of a more than 50 year working relationship as Bennett's "man behind the music" on many Grammy Award-winning studio recordings, and touring with Bennett for many years. Sharon found the song "I Left My Heart in San Francisco" for Bennett, a year after placing the sheet music in a bureau and forgetting about it. Sharon discovered the manuscript while packing for a tour that included San Francisco. While Bennett and Sharon liked the song, they were convinced it would only be a local hit. Instead, the tune became Bennett's signature song.  

On his recording of "I'll Be Home for Christmas" from the 1992 CD Snowfall: The Tony Bennett Christmas Album, Bennett is heard at the end of the song exclaiming "Take me home, Ralph!" as Sharon plays the last notes of the song.

Ralph Sharon was a jazz pianist in his own right, recording a series of his own albums. But Sharon was best known as one of the finest accompanists who backed up popular singers, including Tony Bennett, Robert Goulet, Chris Connor and many others.

Retiring to Boulder, Colorado, from on-the-road work with Bennett when he reached 80, Ralph Sharon continued to perform in the Denver metropolitan area until shortly before his death. Tony Bennett and the Ralph Sharon Trio performed at various jazz venues, including Dazzle Restaurant & Lounge in Denver. He died from natural causes on March 31, 2015.

Discography

Solo albums
1953 Autumn Leaves and Spring Fever
1954 Easy Jazz (As The Ralph Sharon All-Star Sextet)
1956 The Ralph Sharon Trio (As The Ralph Sharon Trio)
1956 Mr. and Mrs. Jazz (With Sue Sharon)
1957 Around the World In Jazz (As The Ralph Sharon Sextet)
1958 2:38 A.M.1963 Modern Innovations In Country and Western Music1964 Do I Hear a Waltz? (As The Ralph Sharon Trio)
1965 The Tony Bennett Songbook (As The Ralph Sharon Trio)
1995 Swings the Sammy Kahn Songbook (As The Ralph Sharon Trio)
1996 Portrait of Harold: The Harold Arlen Songbook (As The Ralph Sharon Trio)
1997 Plays the Harry Warren Songbook (As The Ralph Sharon Trio)
1999 Plays the Frank Loesser Songbook (As The Ralph Sharon Trio)
2000 The Magic of Cole Porter (As The Ralph Sharon Trio)
2001 The Magic of Jerome Kern (As The Ralph Sharon Trio)
2001 The Magic of Irving Berlin (As The Ralph Sharon Trio)
2001 The Magic of George Gershwin (As The Ralph Sharon Trio)
2001 Plays the Ralph Blane Songbook (As The Ralph Sharon Quartet)
2007 Always: The Music of Irving BerlinAs sideman
With Tony Bennett
1962 I Left My Heart in San Francisco 
1963 I Wanna Be Around
1964 When Lights Are Low
1986 The Art of Excellence
1987 Bennett/Berlin 	
1989 Astoria: Portrait of the Artist
1992 Perfectly Frank
1992 Snowfall: The Tony Bennett Christmas Album
1993 Steppin' Out
1994 MTV Unplugged: Tony Bennett (Live)
1995 Here's To The Ladies
1997 Tony Bennett on Holiday
1998 Tony Bennett: The Playground
1999 Bennett Sings Ellington: Hot & Cool
2001 Playing with my friends: Bennett Sings The Blues
With Johnny Hartman
Songs from the Heart (1955)
All of Me: The Debonair Mr. Hartman (1956)

References

External links
 Obituary for Ralph Sharon
 Ralph Sharon interview, part 1 and part 2
 Steve Albin's Tony Bennett Discography
 Tony Bennett Grammy winning recordings
 [ Allmusic Biography]
 Dazzle Jazz Club

1923 births
2015 deaths
American jazz pianists
American male pianists
American music arrangers
British emigrants to the United States
English jazz pianists
Musicians from London
20th-century English musicians
20th-century American pianists
American people of Latvian descent
English people of Latvian descent
20th-century American male musicians
American male jazz musicians